Olympique de Mandji are a football club based in Port-Gentil, Gabon.

The club first played in the Gabon Championnat National D1 during the 2015–16 season.

References 

Football clubs in Gabon
Association football clubs established in 2009